Ayatollah Mohammad Ali Movahedi-Kermani is Tehran's Friday Prayer Ephemeral Imam and the former secretary-general of Combatant Clergy Association. He is also a member of the Assembly of Experts. He is a conservative and principlist politician.

He was formerly one of the deputy speakers in the Islamic Consultative Assembly.

Political career
Movahedi won 685,974 votes of the Kerman Province for his re-election to the 4th Assembly of Experts. He was ranked 2nd after Ahmad Khatami in the constituency.

Views
2019 Mohammad Ali Movahedi Kermani in Tehran Friday prayer declared that Telegram is haram and requested National Information Network deployment like great firewall of china.
Movahedi-Kermani asserts that one must adhere to the instruction of the Chief Islamic Jurisprudent, according to the doctrine of Velayat-e faqih. He also believes that the United States is trying to "portray the clergy and religion as failures."

See also 

 List of Ayatollahs
 List of members in the First Term of the Council of Experts

References

Iranian Islamists
Shia Islamists
Living people
Second Deputies of Islamic Consultative Assembly
Members of the Expediency Discernment Council
Members of the Assembly of Experts
Members of the 4th Islamic Consultative Assembly
Members of the 5th Islamic Consultative Assembly
1931 births
Central Council of the Islamic Republican Party members
Representatives of the Supreme Leader
People from Kerman Province
Iranian ayatollahs
Combatant Clergy Association Secretaries-General